The Mesquite Solar project is a 400-megawatt (MWAC) photovoltaic power plant in Arlington, Maricopa County, Arizona, owned by Sempra Generation. The project was constructed in 3 phases using more than 2.1 million crystalline silicon solar panels made by Suntech Power.

Project details 

Construction of Phase 1 over a 3.6 km2 site adjacent the Palo Verde Nuclear Generating Station began in 2011 and was completed in January 2013. It has a nameplate capacity of 150 megawatts (MW) that is contracted through a 20-year Power Purchase Agreement (PPA) with Pacific Gas and Electric Company (PG&E). The EPC contractor was Zachry Holdings. Phase 1 cost about $600 million, is projected to generate more than 350 gigawatt-hours of electricity annually (an average of about 40 MW), and will offset roughly 200,000 tons of carbon emissions each year.

Phase 2 (100MW) and Phase 3 (150MW) were both completed in December 2016. The panels are mounted on single-axis trackers to increase electricity production.

Electricity production

See also 

 Solar power in Arizona

References 

Solar power stations in Arizona
Photovoltaic power stations in the United States
Buildings and structures in Maricopa County, Arizona
Sempra Energy